Geoffrey "Jeff" Madrigali (born May 8, 1956, in Walnut Creek, California) is an American competitive sailor and Olympic medalist. He won a bronze medal in the Soling class at the 1996 Summer Olympics in Atlanta, together with Jim Barton and Kent Massey.

He sailed on America True at the 2000 Louis Vuitton Cup.

References

External links
 
 
 

1956 births
Living people
2000 America's Cup sailors
American male sailors (sport)
North American Champions Soling
Olympic bronze medalists for the United States in sailing
Sailors at the 1996 Summer Olympics – Soling
Sailors at the 2000 Summer Olympics – Soling
Soling class world champions
Medalists at the 1996 Summer Olympics